Steel is the first full-length album recorded by the heavy metal band Battle Beast. It was released on January 27, 2012  and reached No. 7 on the Finnish Album Chart. It is also the first album and only album to feature Nitte Valo on lead vocals.

Influences
Steel borrows concepts and names from the manga Berserk, for example the lyrics of "Band of the Hawk": 'We are a mercenary band, led by Griffith, the white hawk.' "Iron Hand" similarly refers to protagonist Guts's iron arm, referring to him as the 'Black Swordsman'.

Track listing

Personnel

Battle Beast
Nitte Valo - lead vocals
Juuso Soinio - guitars
Anton Kabanen - guitars, backing vocals
Eero Sipilä - bass, narrator and backing vocals
Pyry Vikki - drums
Janne Björkroth - keyboards, orchestral arrangements, backing vocals

Additional musicians
Netta Dahlberg - additional backing vocals on track 2 and 8
Joona Björkroth - additional backing vocals on track 8
Nino Laurenne - backing vocals

Production
Nino Laurenne - producer, engineer, mixing
Jussi Kraft - engineer, mixing
Svante Forsbäck - mastering

References 

2011 debut albums
Battle Beast (band) albums